The Quezon Eco-Tourism Road is a , two-to-eight lane scenic road in the province of Quezon, Philippines.

The road forms part of National Route 422 (N422) of the Philippine highway network. Previously, the road was originally unnumbered as a barangay road at the time of completion.

Route description 
After experiencing delays due to right-of-way issues, it finally opened to traffic in March 2016, the road bypasses within the town propers of Candelaria and Sariaya. It starts from Rosario–San Juan–Candelaria Road in the west and ends at the Lucena Diversion Road (Maharlika Highway) in Lucena. Travelers from Batangas shortens the travel time as an alternate route to the Bicol Region. Along the roadway, it is a scenic road—where it passes the agricultural land and plantations in the Quezon province.

The road is currently being extended to the north towards Tayabas, with a future connection to San Antonio via the Quezon Eco-Tourism-Sariaya-Candelaria-Tiaong-San Antonio Road.

Intersections

References 

Roads in Quezon
Transportation in Quezon